Jessica Fallah (born 10 July 1999) is an Australian handball player for UTS Handball Club and the Australian national team.

She represented Australia at the 2019 World Women's Handball Championship in Japan, where the Australian team placed 24th.

References

Australian female handball players
1999 births
Living people